Texaphyrin is a sub-class of heterocyclic macrocycle molecules known as porphyrins. The molecule was invented by University of Texas at Austin professor Jonathan Sessler.  The name texaphryin arose because some of the molecules have a shape that can superimpose onto the points of the star featured on the state flag of Texas. Texaphyrins were nominated as the "State Molecule of Texas", but the buckyball was chosen instead.

Sessler has described possible medicinal uses of these compounds in the Proceedings of the National Academy of Sciences and other scientific journals.  Pharmacyclics, Inc., a publicly traded company begun by Sessler, licensed the technology behind texaphyrins from the university to develop commercial and medical uses for the molecules. Motexafin lutetium is a texaphyrin, marketed as Antrin by Pharmacyclics Inc. It is a photosensitiser for use in photodynamic therapy to treat skin conditions and Prostate cancer.

References

External links
Dr. Sessler's Lab home page at the University of Texas

Macrocycles